Heitor Rodrigues da Fonseca (born 5 November 2000), simply known as Heitor, is a Brazilian professional footballer who plays as right back for Ferroviária, on loan from Internacional.

Club career
On 10 March 2021, he was elected one of the 11 best under-20 players on South America for 2020 by IFFHS.

On 23 July 2022, Heitor joined Cercle Brugge in Belgium on loan with an option to buy.

References

2000 births
Sportspeople from Rio Grande do Sul
Living people
People from Pelotas
Brazilian footballers
Association football defenders
Sport Club Internacional players
Cercle Brugge K.S.V. players
Associação Ferroviária de Esportes players
Campeonato Brasileiro Série A players
Belgian Pro League players
Brazilian expatriate footballers
Expatriate footballers in Belgium
Brazilian expatriate sportspeople in Belgium